The 2005 Norwegian Football Cup Final was the final match of the 2005 Norwegian Football Cup, the 100th season of the Norwegian Football Cup, the premier Norwegian football cup competition organized by the Football Association of Norway (NFF). The match was played on 9 November 2003 at the Ullevaal Stadion in Oslo, and opposed two Tippeligaen sides Molde and Lillestrøm. Molde defeated Lillestrøm 4–2 after extra time to claim the Norwegian Cup for a ninth time in their history.

Route to the final

Match

Details

References 

2005
Molde FK matches
Lillestrøm SK matches
Football Cup
Sports competitions in Oslo
2000s in Oslo
Norwegian Football Cup Final
Final